is a 2023 Japanese animated science fiction adventure film. It is the 42nd film of the Japanese animated series Doraemon created by Fujiko F. Fujio. Directed by Takumi Doyama with a screenplay by Ryota Furusawa, it was released in 3 March 2023.

Premise 
Doraemon, Nobita and his friends go to find Utopia, a perfect land in the sky where everyone lives with happiness, using an airship having a time warp function.

Cast

Soundtrack 
The theme song is "Paradise" by NiziU.

See also 
 List of Doraemon films

References

External links
 

2023 films
2023 anime films
2023 fantasy films
2023 science fiction films
Nobita's Sky Utopia
Japanese fantasy adventure films
Films scored by Takayuki Hattori
Japanese science fiction adventure films
Toho animated films